The state of Louisiana has 42 district courts, with each serving at least one parish.

District 1

Parish Served: Caddo Parish

District Seat: Caddo Parish Courthouse (Shreveport, LA)

District 2

Parishes served: Claiborne Parish, Bienville Parish, Jackson Parish

District Seats: Claiborne Parish Courthouse (Homer, LA), Bienville Parish Courthouse (Arcadia, LA), Jackson Parish Courthouse (Jonesboro, LA)

District 3

Parishes served: Union Parish, Lincoln Parish

District Seats: Union Parish Courthouse (Farmerville, LA), Lincoln Parish Courthouse (Ruston, LA)

District 4

Parishes Served: Morehouse Parish, Ouachita Parish

District Seats: Morehouse Parish Courthouse (Bastrop, LA), Ouachita Parish Courthouse (Monroe, LA)

District 5

Parishes Served: Franklin Parish, Richland Parish, West Carroll Parish

District Seats: Franklin Parish Courthouse (Winnsboro, LA), Richland Parish Courthouse (Rayville, LA), West Carroll Parish Courthouse (Oak Grove, LA)

District 6

Parishes Served: East Carroll Parish, Madison Parish, Tensas Parish

District Seats: East Carroll Parish Courthouse (Lake Providence, LA), Madison Parish Courthouse (Tallulah, LA), Tensas Parish Courthouse (St. Joseph, LA)

District 7

Parishes Served: Catahoula Parish, Concordia Parish

District Seats: Catahoula Parish Courthouse (Harrisonburg, LA), Concordia Parish Courthouse (Vidalia, LA)

District 8

Parish Served: Winn Parish

District Seat: Winn Parish Courthouse (Winnfield, LA)

District 9

Parish Served: Rapides Parish

District Seat: Rapides Parish Courthouse (Alexandria, LA)

District 10

Parishes Served: Natchitoches Parish

District Seat: Natchitoches Parish Courthouse (Natchitoches, LA)

District 11

Parish Served: Sabine Parish

District Seat: Sabine Parish Courthouse (Many, LA)

District 12

Parish Served: Avoyelles Parish

District Seat: Avoyelles Parish Courthouse (Marksville, LA)

District 13

Parish Served: Evangeline Parish

District Seat: Evangeline Parish Courthouse (Ville Platte, LA)

District 14

Parish Served: Calcasieu Parish

District Seat: Calcasieu Parish Judicial Center (Lake Charles, LA)

District 15

Parishes Served: Acadia Parish, Lafayette Parish, Vermilion Parish

District Seats: Acadia Parish Courthouse (Crowley, LA), Lafayette Parish Courthouse (Lafayette, LA), Vermilion Parish Courthouse (Abbeville, LA)

District 16

Parishes Served: Iberia Parish, St. Martin Parish, St. Mary Parish

District Seats: Iberia Parish Courthouse (New Iberia, LA), St. Martin Courthouse (St. Martinville, LA), St. Mary Courthouse (Franklin, LA)

District 17

Parish Served: Lafourche Parish

District Seat: Lafourche Parish Courthouse (Thibodaux, LA)

District 18

Parishes Served: Iberville Parish, Pointe Coupee Parish, West Baton Rouge Parish

District Seats: Iberville Parish Courthouse (Plaquemine, LA), Pointe Coupee Courthouse (New Roads, LA), West Baton Rouge Courthouse (Port Allen, LA)

District 19

Parish Served: East Baton Rouge Parish

District Seat: 19th Judicial District Courthouse (Baton Rouge, LA)

District 20

Parishes Served: East Feliciana Parish, West Feliciana Parish

District Seats: East Feliciana Courthouse (Clinton, LA), West Feliciana Courthouse (St. Francisville, LA)

District 21

Parishes Served: Livingston Parish, St. Helena Parish, Tangipahoa Parish

District Seats: Livingston Parish Courthouse (Livingston, LA), St. Helena Parish Courthouse (Greensburg, LA), Tangipahoa Parish Courthouse (Amite, LA)

District 22

Parishes Served: St. Tammany Parish, Washington Parish

District Seats: St. Tammany Parish Courthouse (Covington, LA), Washington Parish Courthouse (Franklinton, LA)

District 23

Parishes Served: Ascension Parish, Assumption Parish, St. James Parish

District Seats: Ascension Parish Courthouse (Donaldsonville, LA), Assumption Parish Courthouse (Napoleonville, LA), St. James Parish Courthouse (Convent, LA)

District 24

Parish Served: Jefferson Parish

District Seat: 24th Judicial District Courthouse (Gretna, LA)

District 25

Parish Served: Plaquemines Parish

District Seat: Plaquemines Parish Courthouse (Belle Chasse, LA)

District 26

Parishes Served: Bossier Parish, Webster Parish

District Seats: Bossier Parish Courthouse (Benton, LA), Webster Parish Courthouse (Minden, LA)

District 27

Parish Served: St. Landry Parish

District Seat: St. Landry Parish Courthouse (Opelousas, LA)

District 28

Parish Served: LaSalle Parish

District Seat: LaSalle Parish Courthouse (Jena, LA)

District 29

Parish Served: St. Charles Parish

District Seat: St. Charles Parish Courthouse (Hahnville, LA)

District 30

Parish Served: Vernon Parish

District Seat: Vernon Parish Courthouse (Leesville, LA)

District 31

Parish Served: Jefferson Davis Parish

District Seat: Jefferson Davis Parish Courthouse (Jennings, LA)

District 32

Parish Served: Terrebonne Parish

District Seat: Terrebonne Parish Courthouse (Houma, LA)

District 33

Parish Served: Allen Parish

District Seat: Allen Parish Courthouse (Oberlin, LA)

District 34

Parish Served: St. Bernard Parish

District Seat: St. Bernard Parish Courthouse (Chalmette, LA)

District 35

Parish Served: Grant Parish

District Seat: Grant Parish Courthouse (Colfax, LA)

District 36

Parish Served: Beauregard Parish

District Seat: Beauregard Parish Courthouse (DeRidder, LA)

District 37

Parish Served: Caldwell Parish

District Seat: Caldwell Parish Courthouse (Columbia, LA)

District 38

Parish Served: Cameron Parish

District Seat: Cameron Parish Courthouse (Cameron, LA)

District 39

Parish Served: Red River Parish

District Seat: Red River Parish Courthouse (Coushatta, LA)

District 40

Parish Served: St. John the Baptist Parish

District Seat: St. John the Baptist Parish Courthouse (Edgard, LA)

Orleans Parish District Courts

Parish Served: Orleans Parish

District Seats: Orleans Civil District Court (New Orleans, LA), Orleans Criminal District Court (New Orleans, LA)

Current Judges

District 42

Parish Served: DeSoto Parish

District Seat: DeSoto Parish Courthouse (Mansfield, LA)

References

Louisiana state courts
Courts and tribunals with year of establishment missing